2 + 2 + 1 = Ponderosa Twins Plus One is the only studio album by American soul vocal group Ponderosa Twins Plus One. It was released in 1971 through Horoscope Records. The album was produced by Bobby Massey of The O'Jays and Michael Burton, a songwriter and a producer of All Platinum Records.

The album spawned two singles, a cover of Sam Cooke's "You Send Me", and "Bound".  "You Send Me" became the band's most successful single release, and both songs charted on Billboards Best Selling Soul Singles chart. The track "Bound" was sampled by rapper Kanye West in his 2013 song, "Bound 2". This was followed by a set of copyright infringement lawsuits by the ex-Ponderosa Twins Plus One member Ricky Spicer, directed at West and related parties. The same track was sampled in 2019 by Tyler, The Creator’s "A BOY IS A GUN* " , for which Bobby Massey received sample credits on.

The album was reissued on vinyl in Japan by P-Vine Records in 1990.

Critical reception

Andrew Hamilton of Allmusic compared the production work of Bobby Massey and Michael Burton, stating that "Massey's sides were the most interesting" Hamilton also further stated: "He knew how to record them, Burton saddled them with a tinny, kiddie sound, and a couple of his productions/compositions are far too strident for ears." He also noted the cover of Sam Cooke's "You Send Me," "Bound," "I Remember You," and "Dad I Love Her" as "album highlights."

Track listing

 "Love You While You Wait" (Burton)	
 "Hey Girl" (Chuck Brown, Bobby Dukes)	
 "Turn Around You Fool" (Burton)	
 "Touchdown" (Dukes, Massey)	
 "That's What I'll Do"	(Burton) 
 "Bound" (Dukes, Massey)		
 "You Send Me" (Sam Cooke)
 "Take Me Back" (Burton)	
 "Like The Big Boys" (Brown)	
 "Dad, I Love Her" (Burton)	
 "I Remember You" (Dukes, Andrew Hamilton, Massey)
 "Mama's Little Baby" (Burton)

Personnel
Ponderosa Twins Plus One
Alfred Pelham
Alvin Pelham
Keith Gardner
Kirk Gardner
Ricky Spicer

Technical personnel
Bobby Massey - production
Michael Burton - arrangement

Charts positions
Singles

References

External links
 

1971 debut albums
Soul albums by American artists
Funk albums by American artists
P-Vine Records albums